SLB may refer to:

 Sustainability-linked bonds
 Single letter beacon, radio transmissions of a single repeating Morse code letter
 S.L. Benfica, a Portuguese sports club based in Lisbon
 SLB Radio Productions, Inc., producers of radio program The Saturday Light Brigade
 SLB, the trade name and ticker symbol of Schlumberger Limited, an energy services company
 Scytalidopepsin B, a proteolytic enzyme
 Sigma Lambda Beta, US fraternity
 Slide-lid box for cabinet selection cigars
 Sport Laulara e Benfica, an East Timorese football team
 Storm Lake Municipal Airport, Iowa, US, IATA code
 Strongside linebacker in American and Canadian football
 Supported lipid bilayers 
 Swedish Friesian or Svensk Låglandsboskap, a Swedish breed of dairy cattle
 Server Load Balancer,  Cloud Computing Term, see Load Balancing